Helga Haugen (born 5 June 1932 in Bamble) is a Norwegian politician for the Christian Democratic Party.

She was elected to the Norwegian Parliament from Aust-Agder in 1985, and was re-elected on one occasion. She had previously served in the position of deputy representative during the term 1981–1985.

She was involved in local politics in Fjære and Grimstad between 1963 and 1985.

References

1932 births
Living people
People from Bamble
Christian Democratic Party (Norway) politicians
Members of the Storting
Women members of the Storting
20th-century Norwegian politicians
20th-century Norwegian women politicians